The 2018 China League One was the 15th season of the China League One, the second tier of the Chinese football league pyramid, since its establishment in 2004. The league's title sponsor is the e-commerce website 58.com. Dalian Transcendence, Heilongjiang Lava Spring, Meizhou Hakka, Meizhou Meixian Techand and Nei Mongol Zhongyou failed to submit the application for the Chinese Super League before deadline, thus ineligible for promotion.

Teams 
A total of 16 teams are contesting in the league, including 12 sides from the 2017 season, two relegated from the 2017 Chinese Super League and two promoted from the 2017 China League Two.

Team changes

To League One 
Teams relegated from 2017 Chinese Super League
 Yanbian Funde
 Liaoning F.C.

Teams promoted from 2017 China League Two
 Heilongjiang Lava Spring
 Meizhou Meixian Techand

From League One 
Teams promoted to 2018 Chinese Super League
 Dalian Yifang
 Beijing Renhe

Teams relegated to 2018 China League Two
 Baoding Yingli ETS
 Yunnan Lijiang

Name changes 
 Hangzhou Greentown F.C. changed their name to Zhejiang Greentown F.C. in January 2018.

Clubs

Stadiums and Locations

Managerial changes

 Zhejiang Yiteng didn't appoint a new manager after Maurício Copertino's departure. Team leader Hu Zhaojun took charge of the club in fact.

Foreign players

A total of four foreign players can be registered in a season; however, the number of foreign players is limited to three per CL1 team in the same time. Maximum of two foreign players can be fielded in one match.

Players name in bold indicates the player is registered during the mid-season transfer window.

 A club could register one non-naturalized player from the Hong Kong Football Association, Macau Football Association or Chinese Taipei Football Association as native player. For special, Beijing Enterprises could register both Chen Hao-wei and Wen Chih-hao as native player before their current contracts end.
Foreign players who left their clubs or were sent to reserve team after the first half of the season.

League table

Results

Positions by round

Results by match played

Relegation play-offs

First leg

Second leg

Meizhou Meixian Techand won 3–2 on aggregate and therefore both clubs remain in their respective leagues.

Goalscorers

Top scorers
{| class="wikitable"
|-
!Rank
!Player
!Club
!Total
|-
! rowspan="1"|1
| John Mary
|Meizhou Hakka
|
|-
! rowspan="1"|2
| Harold Preciado
|Shenzhen F.C.
|
|-
! rowspan="1"|3
| Rafael Silva
|Wuhan Zall
|
|-
! rowspan="1"|4
|  André Senghor
| Nei Mongol Zhongyou
|
|-
! rowspan="1"|5
| Dino Ndlovu
|Zhejiang Greentown
|
|-
! rowspan="1"|6
|  Franck Ohandza
| Shenzhen F.C. 
|
|-
! rowspan="3"|7
| Joan Verdú
|Qingdao Huanghai
|
|-|-
| Muriqui
|Meizhou Meixian Techand
|
|-
|  Jean Evrard Kouassi
|Wuhan Zall
|
|-
! rowspan="2"|10
| Dominic Vinicius
|Beijing Enterprises Group
|
|-
| Sérgio Mota
|Zhejiang Yiteng
|
|-
! rowspan="3" |12
| Jacob Mulenga
|Liaoning F.C.
|
|-|-
| Babacar Gueye
|Heilongjiang Lava Spring
|
|-
| Matheus
| Shijiazhuang Ever Bright
|
|-|-
! rowspan="1" |15
| Aloísio
|Meizhou Meixian Techand
|
|-
! rowspan="2" |16
| Guto
|Zhejiang Yiteng
|
|-|-
| Cléo
|Qingdao Huanghai 
|
|-
! rowspan="4" |18
| Alen Melunović
|Shijiazhuang Ever Bright
|
|-
|  Taty Oscar
|Yanbian Funde
|
|-
| Gerard Gohou
|Beijing Enterprises Group
|
|-|-
|  Rafael Martins
|Zhejiang Greentown
|
|-
! rowspan="3" |22
| Rafael Silva
|Dalian Transcendence
|
|-|-
| John Owoeri
|Shanghai Shenxin
|
|-|-
| Gao Xiang
|Qingdao Huanghai 
|
|-|-
! rowspan="4" |25
| Wu Yizhen
|Shanghai Shenxin
|
|-|-
| Victor Bolt
|Heilongjiang Lava Spring
|
|-|-
| Wang Jianwen
|Beijing Enterprises Group
|
|-
| Cui Ren
|Yanbian Funde
|
|-
! rowspan="1" |29
| Dori
|Nei Mongol Zhongyou
|
|-|-
! rowspan="4" |30
| Sabit Abdusalam
| Xinjiang Tianshan Leopard
|
|-|-
|  Xu Junmin
|Shanghai Shenxin
|
|-
| Liu Xuanchen
| Xinjiang Tianshan Leopard 
|
|-|-
|  Pedro Junior
|Wuhan Zall
|
|-|-
! rowspan="6" |34
| Biro Biro
|Shanghai Shenxin
|
|-
| Francisco Sandaza 
|Qingdao Huanghai 
|
|-|-
| Serges Déblé
|Meizhou Hakka
|
|-|-
| Ji Xiaoxuan
|Zhejiang Yiteng
|
|-|-
| Gustavo Vagenin
|Liaoning F.C.
|
|-
| Wang Dong
|Qingdao Huanghai 
|
|-|-
! rowspan="7"|40
| Chen Po-liang
| Zhejiang Greentown
|
|-|-
| Wang Peng
| Shijiazhuang Ever Bright
|
|-|-
| Yin Lu
|Dalian Transcendence
|
|-|-
| José Antonio Reyes
| Xinjiang Tianshan Leopard
|
|-|-
| Ye Chugui
|Shenzhen F.C.
|
|-|-
| Andy Russell
| Liaoning F.C.
|
|-|-
|  Yaki Yen
| Qingdao Huanghai 
|
|-|-

Hat-tricks

Awards
The awards of 2018 China League One were announced on 15 November 2018.

League attendance

Notes

References

External links 
Official website 

China League One seasons
2
China
China